Massachusetts House of Representatives' 10th Essex district in the United States is one of 160 legislative districts included in the lower house of the Massachusetts General Court. It covers part of the city of Lynn in Essex County. Democrat Dan Cahill of Lynn has represented the district since 2016.

The current district geographic boundary overlaps with that of the Massachusetts Senate's 3rd Essex district.

Representatives
 William Hardy, circa 1858 
 A. J. French, circa 1859 
 William Howe Burnham, circa 1888 
 George Dennis, circa 1888 
 Cyrus Story, circa 1888 
 Walter Thomas Creese, circa 1920 
 Frederick Willis, circa 1945
 Philip J. Durkin, 1949–1957 
 John E. Murphy, circa 1951 
 Norris W. Harris, circa 1975 
 Timothy A. Bassett
 Vincent Lozzi
 Jeffery Hayward
 Robert Fennell
 Daniel H. Cahill, 2016-current

Former locales
The district previously covered:
 Beverly, circa 1872 
 Hamilton, circa 1872 
 Manchester, circa 1872

See also
 List of Massachusetts House of Representatives elections
 Other Essex County districts of the Massachusetts House of Representatives: 1st, 2nd, 3rd, 4th, 5th, 6th, 7th, 8th, 9th,  11th, 12th, 13th, 14th, 15th, 16th, 17th, 18th
 Essex County districts of the Massachusett Senate: 1st, 2nd, 3rd; 1st Essex and Middlesex; 2nd Essex and Middlesex
 List of Massachusetts General Courts
 List of former districts of the Massachusetts House of Representatives

Images

References

External links
 Ballotpedia
  (State House district information based on U.S. Census Bureau's American Community Survey).

House
Government of Essex County, Massachusetts